Bourdons-sur-Rognon is a commune in the Haute-Marne department in northeastern France.

The former La Crête Abbey was located here.

Population

See also
Communes of the Haute-Marne department

References

Communes of Haute-Marne